Hovea is a suburb in the Shire of Mundaring in Perth, Western Australia. 

It is centred on Jane Brook and encompasses the Railway Reserve Heritage Trail (formerly the Eastern Railway) and John Forrest National Park.

Hovea extends as far north as Toodyay Road, and south to Glen Forrest and  Great Eastern Highway. Its western boundary is also the western boundary of the park. Hovea (named for a native Australian flowering plant) was originally named Park View, but the name was changed in 1912 to avoid confusion between Park View, Swan View, National Park and Bellevue, all nearby railway stations.

References

External links
 Hovea on Geoscience Australia
Suburbs and localities in the Shire of Mundaring
Suburbs of Perth, Western Australia
Darling Range